Aranyer Adhikar (Rights over the Forest, first published 1977) is a Bengali novel written by Mahasweta Devi. For this novel Mahasweta Devi received Sahitya Akademi Award in 1979. The novel narrates the life and fight of Indian tribal freedom fighter Birsa Munda.

References 

Bengali-language novels
Sahitya Akademi Award-winning works
20th-century Indian novels